Martín Cardetti (born 22 October 1975 in Río Cuarto) is an Argentine football manager and former player who played as a forward. He played professional club football in Argentina, Spain, France, Mexico, Uruguay and Colombia.

Club career
Cardetti started his career in 1995 at Rosario Central, he helped the club to claim the 1995 Copa CONMEBOL.

In 1997, he joined River Plate where he played a part in the team that won the Apertura title and the Supercopa Sudamericana in 1997.

In 1998 Cardetti moved to Spain to play for UD Salamanca but it did not work out for him and he returned to River Plate in 1999. He won a further three titles with River Plate before trying his luck in European football for a second time.

Paris Saint-Germain FC signed Cardetti in 2002, but his spell in France only lasted one season. He moved to Real Valladolid in 2003 and back to Argentina to join Racing Club in 2005. Later in 2005 Cardetti played for Mexican UNAM Pumas but he returned to Argentina once again to play for Gimnasia de La Plata.

During the 2007 January transfer window Cardetti joined Deportivo Cali. After a slow season start, Martin has shown all his potential as key player, becoming MVP during last semifinal game, in which Deportivo Cali beat Boyacá Chicó.

After only a few months with Deportivo Cali Cardetti returned to Argentina to play for Colón de Santa Fe.

Managerial career
Cardetti was named manager of Costa Rican side Uruguay de Coronado in December 2014.

Titles and awards

References

External links
 
 Argentine Primera statistics at Fútbol XXI  
 
 Martín Cardetti at Footballdatabase

Argentine footballers
Association football forwards
Rosario Central footballers
Argentine Primera División players
Club Atlético River Plate footballers
La Liga players
UD Salamanca players
Real Valladolid players
Ligue 1 players
Paris Saint-Germain F.C. players
Expatriate footballers in France
Racing Club de Avellaneda footballers
Club de Gimnasia y Esgrima La Plata footballers
Categoría Primera A players
Deportivo Cali footballers
Club Atlético Colón footballers
Liga MX players
Club Universidad Nacional footballers
People from Río Cuarto, Córdoba
1975 births
Living people
Boyacá Chicó F.C. footballers
Boston River players
Expatriate footballers in Colombia
Expatriate footballers in Uruguay
Argentine expatriate sportspeople in Colombia
Argentine expatriate footballers
Argentine expatriate sportspeople in Spain
Argentine people of Italian descent
Expatriate football managers in Uruguay
Expatriate football managers in Costa Rica
Argentine expatriate sportspeople in France
Argentine expatriate sportspeople in Uruguay
Argentine football managers
Independiente Santa Fe managers
Expatriate football managers in Colombia
Sportspeople from Córdoba Province, Argentina
Mushuc Runa S.C. managers